Achraf Bencharki (born 24 September 1994) is a Moroccan professional footballer who plays for Al Jazira. He can be deployed as a left winger or as a forward.

Club career
Born in Oulad Zbair, Morocco, Bencharki began his career at Maghreb de Fès where he joined the first team for the 2014–15 season. In the 2015–16 season, he scored 9 goals in 27 matches.

In 2016, he moved to Wydad Casablanca for a reported transfer fee of 300 million Moroccan dirham. He helped the club win the 2017 CAF Champions League and qualify for the FIFA Club World Cup. He was praised for his performances in the CAF Champions League and was widely considered the best player of the competitions's final.

In January 2018, Bencharki joined Saudi Professional League club Al-Hilal for a $9 million transfer fee.

In August 2018, he joined Ligue 2 club RC Lens on loan for the 2018–19 season.

In July 2019, Bencharki joined Egyptian Premier League side Zamalek SC on a three-year contract. On 18 October 2020, he scored the only goal in 1–0 away win for Zamalek SC over Raja Casablanca in the 2019–20 CAF Champions League semi-finals.

International career
Bencharki played for the Morocco national under-23 team and under 21 team having previously played for their under-20 team.

Bencharki represented Morocco in the 2018 African Nations Championship, helping his country to achieve the first chan title for Morocco. He scored his first goal for Morocco against Mauritania in a 4-0 victory.

Honours
Wydad Casablanca
 Botola: 2016–17
 CAF Champions League: 2017

Al Hilal
 Saudi Professional League: 2017–18
 Saudi Super Cup: 2018

Zamalek
 Egyptian Premier League: 2020–21, 2021–22
 Egypt Cup: 2018–19 , 2020–21
 Egyptian Super Cup: 2019
 CAF Super Cup: 2020

Morocco A
 African Nations Championship: 2018Individual'''

Toulon Tournament Golden Boot: 2015
 CAF Team of the Year: 2017

References

External links
 

Living people
1994 births
People from Fez, Morocco
Association football forwards
Association football midfielders
Moroccan footballers
Morocco international footballers
Morocco A' international footballers
2018 African Nations Championship players
Botola players
Saudi Professional League players
Ligue 2 players
Egyptian Premier League players
UAE Pro League players
Wydad AC players
Maghreb de Fès players
Al Hilal SFC players
RC Lens players
Zamalek SC players
Al Jazira Club players
Moroccan expatriate sportspeople in Saudi Arabia
Expatriate footballers in Saudi Arabia
Moroccan expatriate sportspeople in France
Expatriate footballers in France
Moroccan expatriate sportspeople in Egypt
Expatriate footballers in Egypt
Moroccan expatriate sportspeople in the United Arab Emirates
Expatriate footballers in the United Arab Emirates